Jam Session is a 1942 short film, directed by Josef Berne, which shows Duke Ellington and his orchestra performing "C Jam Blues".

In 2001, the United States Library of Congress deemed the 3-minute, black-and-white film "culturally, historically, or aesthetically significant" and selected it for preservation in the National Film Registry.

The short 16 mm film was a Soundie, distributed by the Soundie Distributing Corporation
for playback in the Panoram film jukebox. Jam Session is included on the DVD Duke Ellington: Early Tracks from the Master of Swing (2006).

The orchestra
In order of appearance:

 Duke Ellington
 Ray Nance
 Rex Stewart
 Ben Webster
 Joe Nanton
 Barney Bigard
 Sonny Greer

References

External links

 Jam Session essay by Mark Cantor on the National Film Registry
 Jam Session essay by Daniel Eagan in America's Film Legacy: The Authoritative Guide to the Landmark Movies in the National Film Registry, A&C Black, 2010 , pages 347-348

1942 films
United States National Film Registry films
American black-and-white films
1942 short films
Jazz films
Duke Ellington
Films directed by Josef Berne